Muhoroni is a town in Kisumu County, Kenya. Muhoroni hosts a town council. It has an urban population of 13,664 and a total population of 31,148 (1999 census ). Muhoroni has a railway station along the Nairobi-Kisumu Railway. The town is located 50 kilometres east of Kisumu Chemelil, a smaller town, is located 10 kilometres west of Muhoroni. Cost of living in Muhoroni is so high and densely populated housing.

Township 
The Muhoroni town council has five wards: Fort Ternan God Nyithindo, Koru, Muhoroni Town, and Owaga.

Muhoroni is home to Muhoroni Sugar Mill and Agro-Chemical & food Company Limited among others. The latter also owns Agro-Chemical while the former is the principal sponsor to the now relegated Muhoroni Youth football Club  both of which have had a stint at the top flight level Kenyan Premier League.

Geography 

Elevation is 1475m.

See also 

 Railway stations in Kenya

References

External links 
 https://web.archive.org/web/20070929022515/http://www.maseno.ac.ke/schools/urban/urbanstudio.htm

Kisumu County
Populated places in Nyanza Province